Gerald Rose (11 April 1941 – 12 June 2007) was a New Zealand cricketer. He played in nine first-class matches for Central Districts and Northern Districts from 1958 to 1968.

References

External links
 

1941 births
2007 deaths
New Zealand cricketers
Central Districts cricketers
Northern Districts cricketers
Cricketers from Palmerston North